Events from the year 1712 in Scotland.

Incumbents 

 Secretary of State for Scotland: The Earl of Mar

Law officers 
 Lord Advocate – Sir James Stewart
 Solicitor General for Scotland – Thomas Kennedy jointly with Sir James Steuart, Bt.

Judiciary 
 Lord President of the Court of Session – Lord North Berwick
 Lord Justice General – Lord Ilay
 Lord Justice Clerk – Lord Grange

Events 
 3 March – Scottish Episcopalians Act 1711 comes into effect, leading to incorporation of the Scottish Episcopal Church.
 1 May – the Church Patronage (Scotland) Act 1711 comes into effect.
 3 October – warrant issued for the arrest of outlaw Rob Roy MacGregor by Sir James Stewart (Lord Advocate) at the instigation of James Graham, 1st Duke of Montrose.

Births 
 12 March – Sir Hew Dalrymple, 2nd Baronet, politician (died 1790)
 25 September – James Veitch, Lord Elliock, judge, politician and landowner (died 1793)
 26 September – Alexander Hamilton, physician and satirical writer in colonial Maryland (died 1756)
 8 October – Alison Cockburn, née Rutherford, poet, wit and socialite (died 1794)
 21 October – James Steuart, economist (died 1780)
 22 October – James Hamilton, 8th Earl of Abercorn (born, and died 1789, in England)

Deaths 
 12 July – Richard Cromwell, Lord Protector of the Commonwealth of England, Scotland and Ireland 1658–59 (born 1626, and died, in England)
 23 September – Thomas Halyburton, theologian (born 1674)
 15 November – James Hamilton, 4th Duke of Hamilton, Premier Peer of Scotland (born 1658; killed in a celebrated duel in England)

See also 

 Timeline of Scottish history

References 

 
Years of the 18th century in Scotland
Scotland
1710s in Scotland